Mohammed Houmri (born 13 March 1993) is an Algerian boxer. He competed in the men's light heavyweight event at the 2020 Summer Olympics.

References

External links
 

1993 births
Living people
Algerian male boxers
Olympic boxers of Algeria
Boxers at the 2020 Summer Olympics
Place of birth missing (living people)
African Games bronze medalists for Algeria
African Games medalists in boxing
Competitors at the 2019 African Games
21st-century Algerian people
Mediterranean Games medalists in boxing
Mediterranean Games silver medalists for Italy
Mediterranean Games bronze medalists for Italy
Competitors at the 2018 Mediterranean Games
Competitors at the 2022 Mediterranean Games